Auguste Van de Verre was a Belgian archer. He won two gold medals at the 1920 Olympics.

References

Year of birth missing
Year of death missing
Belgian male archers
Olympic archers of Belgium
Archers at the 1920 Summer Olympics
Olympic gold medalists for Belgium
Olympic medalists in archery
Medalists at the 1920 Summer Olympics